Convergence of Hope (in French: Convergence de l'Espoir) is a Sankarist political party in Burkina Faso. It was founded in July 2004 by the Current of Democrats Faithful to the Ideal of Thomas Sankara that split from the Union for Rebirth/Sankarist Movement in 2003.

It is led by Jean-Hubert Bazié.

History
The Current of Democrats Faithful to the Ideal of Thomas Sankara (in French: Courant des Démocrates Fidèles à l'Idéal de Thomas Sankara) was founded in 2003 as split from the Union for Rebirth/Sankarist Movement. In July 2004 it was renamed Convergence of Hope.

Political parties in Burkina Faso
Sankarist political parties in Burkina Faso